Tridacna rosewateri is a species of marine bivalve in the family Cardiidae.

Distribution
It is endemic to Mauritius.

Locus typicus: "Saya de Malha Bank, Indian Ocean."

References

 Sirenko, B. I. & Scarlato, O. A. (1991). Tridacna rosewateri sp. n. Una nuova specie di Tridacna dall'Oceano Indiano. A new species of giant clam from Indian Ocean. La Conchiglia. 22 (261): 4-9
 Sirenko, B. I. & Scarlato, O. A. (1991). Tridacna rosewateri sp. n. Una nuova specie di Tridacna dall'Oceano Indiano. A new species of giant clam from Indian Ocean. La Conchiglia. 22 (261): 4-9

External links
 Fauvelot, C.; Zuccon, D.; Borsa, P.; Grulois, D.; Magalon, H.; Riquet, F.; Andréfouët, S.; Berumen, M. L.; Sinclair‐Taylor, T. H.; Gélin, P.; Behivoke, F.; Poorten, J. J. ter; Strong, E. E.; Bouchet, P. (2020). Phylogeographical patterns and a cryptic species provide new insights into Western Indian Ocean giant clams phylogenetic relationships and colonization history. Journal of Biogeography. 176: 104715

rosewateri
Molluscs of Mauritius
Endemic fauna of Mauritius
Bivalves described in 1991
Taxonomy articles created by Polbot